Spirit Creek is a river located in the Assiniboine River watershed in the Canadian province of Saskatchewan. It begins east of Rama and flows south-east into the north end of Good Spirit Lake. From Patterson Lake, it empties into the north end of Good Spirit Lake.

Near the mouth of the river is Bella Sands Resort, Good Spirit Petting Zoo, and the northern most point of Good Spirit Lake Provincial Park. At the south end of Good Spirit Lake, there's a dam and an outflow channel. That channel flows eastward into a tributary of Whitesand River. Whitesand River continues eastward and meets up with the Assiniboine River.

The dam and reservoir were built in the 1920s by Canadian Northern Railway to provide steam locomotives with a water source. Later, it was owned and operated by the village of Rama. Most recently, Big Sky Farms owned the dam.

See also 
List of rivers of Saskatchewan
Hudson Bay drainage basin

References 

Rivers of Saskatchewan
Invermay No. 305, Saskatchewan
Good Lake No. 274, Saskatchewan
Tributaries of Hudson Bay
Tributaries of the Assiniboine River